"Your Style" is the fifth single from J. Williams' debut album, Young Love. The song features Erakah. The official remix also features Tyree., and is on the Collector's Edition of Williams' album.

Music video
The music video uses the remixed track, featuring both Erakah and Tyree. It was released at the iTunes Store on 14 December 2009.

Chart performance

References

2009 singles
J. Williams (singer) songs
Erakah songs
Illegal Musik singles
2009 songs
Songs written by J. Williams (singer)
Songs written by Inoke Finau